Bar is the local Czech version of Nordic reality show The Bar. The show first aired between 9 July 2006 and 2 September 2006. It was broadcast on TV Prima, with Libor Bouček and Laďka Něrgešová presenting.

Contestants

Nominations
Teams:
Red Team: Tomáš, Marcela, Luboš, Petra, Flary & Míša.
Yellow Team: Anife, Rocker, Dagmar, Drobek, Honza, Jarka & Pavel.
Rules:
The person with the lowest score from each team is their candidate for nomination.
If more than one person in a team has the lowest score, then the person with the highest score must decide which will be up for nomination.
The public then decides which of the two candidates for nomination will be up for eviction.
The person with the highest score from the team the public chooses much choose the second person up for eviction.
Finally, the public votes on who they want to save out of the two nominees. The one with the fewest votes is evicted.

References

Czech reality television series
2006 Czech television series debuts
2006 Czech television series endings
Prima televize original programming